Ackley Bridge is a British drama television series that focuses on the lives of the staff and pupils at the fictional West Yorkshire secondary academy, Ackley Bridge College, in the fictitious mill town of Ackley Bridge. The first series consisted of six episodes and aired from 7 June to 12 July 2017. The second series consisted of twelve episodes and aired from 5 June to 21 August 2018. A third series consisting of eight episodes aired from 18 June 2019 to 6 August 2019.

In December 2019, Ackley Bridge was renewed for a fourth series, consisting of ten 30-minute episodes. The fourth series was originally set to air in September 2020, but due to the COVID-19 pandemic, filming was postponed. Production resumed in September 2020, and it was announced that the series would return to transmission in April 2021. In June 2021, it was announced that production on the fifth series of Ackley Bridge had commenced. The series premiered on All 4 in July 2022. In October 2022, Channel 4 announced that they had decided not to renew Ackley Bridge following the fifth series.

Series overview

Episodes

Series 1 (2017)

Series 2 (2018)

Series 3 (2019)

Series 4 (2021)

Series 5 (2022)

References

Episodes
Ackley Bridge